Al Unser Jr.'s Turbo Racing is a racing video game for the Nintendo Entertainment System console released in 1990. It is an adaptation of the 1989 Japanese-market Famicom game , with the most notable changes being the addition of Unser as an in-game coach, the number of laps, sound and interface design. Therefore, the game remains based on the Formula 1 World Championship, despite Unser having never competed in it. This game features a season mode and two time trial modes. In season mode the player uses either Al Unser Jr. or a make-their-own-driver.

Versions released outside North America were simply titled Turbo Racing with all references to Unser removed, due to the relative obscurity of CART and Unser outside of North America.

Gameplay
The game is a racing video game. The player directs the car using the D-pad, accelerating with A and braking with B. The gauges, speed, and several other things can be seen at the bottom of the screen. Turbo boosts can be used by the player when necessary, but must be refuelled when empty. Hazards such as signposts and other cars must be avoided. Qualifying is held prior to each race, but is difficult because only one lap is given.

Due to the limitations of the NES, curves appear to come out of nowhere, making turning unusually difficult.

Modes

World Championship Season
Players choosing the World Championship Season could race as Al Unser, Jr., or start their own team. Playing as Unser, Jr. gave the player the best car possible and the best chance to win immediately. If a player chose to start their own team, they would have to spend a season climbing up the rankings, improving the car. Players run a full 16-race schedule, with several races varying in distance.

If a player drives as Unser, Jr., he takes his likeness, and drives the blue and white Valvoline Lola- Chevrolet. If a player starts his or her own team, a name is entered, and personalized team colours are chosen. Unser, Jr.'s car is maxed out for set-up points, and a new entry starts with minimal set-up points. The remainder of the championship season is filled with fictional drivers, bringing the total to 26 cars per race.

At each race, the player has the chance to receive advice about the course from Al Unser, Jr., and set up the car to qualify. Unlimited practice is also allowed prior to qualifying. During qualifying, a player must complete one lap as fast as possible to determine the starting position on the grid. If a player qualifies fastest, they will start on the pole position. If a player retires from qualifying, he will start last (26th). The player is allowed one last opportunity to set up the car for the race, and chose the music to be played during the race. The race begins from a standing start, and runs a specific number of laps.

For each race, points towards the championship are awarded to the top six finishers (9-6-4-3-2-1), consistent with the points system utilized in Formula One at the time. The top six finishers also receive a certain number of set-up points to improve the car. At the end of the season, the driver with the most points wins the World Championship.

During each race, the player must avoid accidents such as running into other cars and hitting signposts. Accidents can harm engines or blow tires, which can be repaired by pitting. While pitting, the race is halted so as not to put the player at a disadvantage due to each race's unusually short length (about three to five laps).

The game uses a turbo boost system, which, when depleted, must be refilled before it causes engine damage.

Time trial mode 
The game featured two time trial modes, "A" (with computer opponents) and "B" (without computer opponents). Players could choose any of the sixteen tracks, and number of laps (1-9). The gameplay was the same as that of the World Championship season. The fastest lap would be recorded for each session. As many as four players could run the time trial, one at a time, and the best laps were recorded for comparison.

Circuits
Turbo Racing features a 16-race Formula One schedule, loosely resembling that of 1988. Several of the tracks were not accurately depicted, and some were replaced. The sequence did not follow that of the Formula One schedule. The tracks were as follows:

 The Austria circuit in the game is based on Zeltweg in Austria. Austria was no longer on the Formula One schedule at the time the game was released. The Imola circuit in San Marino, which was part of the schedule prior to and at the time the game was released, was absent from the game.
 The USA circuit is based on the Long Beach Grand Prix street circuit. The circuit was part of the Formula One circuit from 1976 to 1983, but used a slightly different layout at the time. Starting in 1984, and at the time the game was released, the Long Beach circuit was part of the CART series. The layout in the game depicts the circuit's configuration at that period. In his career, Unser, Jr. was very successful and won six times on the course, which is speculation on why the track was included in the game. The United States Grand Prix was held at Phoenix Street Circuit the year of the game's release.
 The Mexico circuit used in the game was based on an old layout of Autodromo Hermanos Rodriguez, which was no longer in use at the time the game was released.
 All tracks in the game measured approximately 3.3 miles, and the fastest lap possible on any and all tracks was 52.6 seconds. In reality, all of the circuits widely vary in distance and lap time.

See also 
 Al Unser Jr.
 Al Unser Jr.'s Road to the Top
 Michael Andretti's World GP
 Danny Sullivan's Indy Heat

Notes

References
Al Unser Jr.'s Turbo Racing at GameFAQs

1990 video games
Data East video games
Formula One video games
Nintendo Entertainment System games
Nintendo Entertainment System-only games
Racing video games
Unser, Al
Video games developed in Japan
Unser, Al
Unser, Al